Phan Tuấn Tài (born 7 January 2001) is a Vietnamese professional footballer who plays as a defender for V.League 1 club Viettel and the Vietnam national team.

International career

International goals

U-23

Honours
Vietnam U23
 AFF U-23 Championship: 2022
 Southeast Asian Games: 2021
Vietnam
VFF Cup: 2022

References

External links
 

2001 births
Living people
People from Đắk Lắk Province
Vietnamese footballers
Association football defenders
Viettel FC players
Vietnam youth international footballers
Competitors at the 2021 Southeast Asian Games
Southeast Asian Games competitors for Vietnam